The Torment is the debut studio album by the British Christian thrash metal band Seventh Angel, released on Music for Nations in 1990. The album established the band as "one of England's leading thrash metal bands" by The Daily Telegraph. In 2010, HM Magazine ranked it number 51 on the Top 100 Christian Metal Albums of All Time list.

Recording
After signing with Under One Flag, a subsidiary label of Music for Nations, Seventh Angel recorded the debut at Mad Hat Studios, Wolverhampton, with producer Paul Hodson. The cover art was done by Rodney Matthews. The album features plenty of tempo changes, progressive elements and considerable amount of death/thrash leanings. Several songs from two of Seventh Angel's three demos were re-recorded for The Torment. The album cover, created by Rodney Matthews, directly references Revelation 9 in the New Testament.

The Torment has been reissued on various record labels. In 2008, a remaster was released by Polish label Metal Mind Productions, which was limited to 2,000 copies and included the demo song "Lamentations" as a bonus track. In 2005 and 2018, American label Retroactive Records released remasters of the album, the latter being part of the "Legends Remastered" series of reissues.

Reception
In a review published on 1 September 1990, Brian Hoff of Cross Rhythms magazine gave the album 8 points out of 10, stating that he was particularly impressed by the music and lyrics. Hoff wrote that, "There can be no doubt about it, this album is going to offend, shock, worry and disgust some people." In reference to the lyrics, he promised they would, "...smack you straight between the eyes and tell it as it is."

For example, "Dr. Hatchet" is a song which accuses those in the medical profession who perform abortions of being cold-blooded murderers. According to Hoff, the song caused "much controversy amongst certain so-called Christian event organizers." Musically, Hoff felt that the only thing that needed criticism was Ian Arkleys vocals: "These are excellent for the thrash numbers, but unlike his guitar work, lack the range, imagination and musicality to cope with a track like 'Katie' where some real vocal dexterity is called for, Ian sounds more like he's talking or doing a 'Make Way' chant than singing." After the release, the British newspaper The Daily Telegraph wrote that Seventh Angel is one of England's leading Christian thrash metal bands. The Torment achieved notable mainstream distribution.

In the 2018 reissue liner notes, Ian Arkley describes the songs on The Torment as "heartfelt", though he states his own lyrics as currently being "a million miles away from my thoughts", while speaking positively about Simon Bibby's lyrics due to him being able to "write in a more poetic way". Eventually, the lyrical style would become more subtle on Lament for the Weary, the band's second studio album.

Tour
During the months following the album's release, the band played concerts in Dudley and Stourbridge, five times in Brierley Hill's The Rock Tavern club. In November 1990, Seventh Angel headlined the Metal Meltdown festival.

In February 1991, Seventh Angel appeared on BBC TV four times with video material recorded at the Metal Meltdown festival. "Forbidden Desires" was the selected song.

Track listing

 live version appears on Heed the Warning: Live & Demo Recordings (2005)
 songs re-recorded from the Heed the Warning demo (1990)
 songs re-recorded from The Rehearsal Demo (1989)

 appears on the Demo Collection (2017)

Personnel

Seventh Angel
Ian Arkley – vocals, guitars
Scott A. Rawson – rhythm guitar
Simon Bibby – bass guitar, narration on "The Charmer", duet vocals with Arkley on "Epilogue"
Andrew "Tank" Thompson – drums

Production
Paul Hodson – producer, engineer (1990 version)
Roy M. Rowland – producer (2005 version), engineer (2005 and 2018 versions)
Matthew B. Hunt – executive producer (2018 version)Additional personnel
Rodney Matthews – artwork
Paul Hodson – additional instruments
Nick Capewell, Wayne Jukes, Lynn Williams, and Seventh Angel – backing vocals
Rev – remastering at Creation Station Media (2005 version)
Jeff Mortimer – remastering at JM Mastering in London, England (2008 version)
Rob Colwell – remastering at Bombworks Sound in McKinney, Texas (2018 version)
Scott Waters (Ultimatum) – design, layout (2018 version)

References

External links
Album at Metal Archives

1990 albums
Seventh Angel albums
Albums with cover art by Rodney Matthews